Julius Harper Davis Jr. (December 11, 1925 – December 26, 2020) was an American football player and coach. He played professionally as a defensive back in the All-America Football Conference (AAFC) and the National Football League (NFL). Davis served as the head football coach at Millsaps College from 1964 to 1988, compiling a record of 136–81–4.

College career
Davis played college football at Mississippi State University from 1945 until 1948. He was the Bulldogs leading scorer in 1945, 1947, and 1948 and was named MSU Best Athlete three years in a row from 1946 to 1948. Davis was named to the AP All-SEC team and the UPI All-South team in 1945 and the College All-Star Game in 1949.

Professional career
Davis was drafted in the second round of the 1949 NFL Draft by the NFL's Pittsburgh Steelers but played that year for the Los Angeles Dons of the All-America Football Conference. Following the 1949 season the AAFC merged with the NFL and all but three of the ten AAFC teams were disbanded while the 49ers, Browns, and Colts joined the NFL. The players from the disbanded teams entered a dispersal draft and Davis was the first round selection of the Chicago Bears. Davis spent one season in Chicago and led the team in interceptions with five. Davis left Chicago and spent the following season as a member of the Green Bay Packers during the 1951 NFL season.

Coaching career
Davis began his coaching career as the head coach at West Point High School in West Point, Mississippi. After one season at West Point he took the head coaching job at Columbus Lee High School in Columbus, Mississippi. after spending a single season as the coach of the Lee Generals, Davis returned to his Alma Mater, Mississippi State, and served as an assistant from 1956 through 1963. Davis left MSU to take over as the head coach at Millsaps College in Jackson, Mississippi. As the head coach at Millsaps he compiled an overall record of 136–81–4 in 25 seasons including an undefeated 9–0 season in 1980. He also led the Majors to their first Division III playoff appearance in 1975. Davis retired from Millsaps following the 1988 season. After his retirement from Millsaps, he served as an assistant coach at Jackson Academy in Jackson, Mississippi from 1990 to 2006.

Honors and awards
AP All-SEC 1945
UPI All-South 1945
Mississippi State University Best Athlete 1946-48
Mississippi State University Sports Hall of Fame 1974
Mississippi Sportsman of the Year in 1976
Mississippi Sports Hall of Fame 1980
Millsaps Sports Hall of Fame 1989
Harper Davis Field, home of the Millsaps Majors football, soccer, and lacrosse teams was named in his honor in 2004
He has been honored nationally for his contributions to the sport of football and his work with the Cystic Fibrosis Foundation.

See also
 List of Chicago Bears players
 List of Green Bay Packers players

References

External links
 

1925 births
2020 deaths
American football defensive backs
Chicago Bears players
Green Bay Packers players
Los Angeles Dons players
Millsaps Majors football coaches
Mississippi State Bulldogs football coaches
Mississippi State Bulldogs football players
Saint Mary's Pre-Flight Air Devils football players
High school football coaches in Mississippi
Sportspeople from Clarksdale, Mississippi
Coaches of American football from Mississippi
Players of American football from Mississippi